Celebrity Samurai (formerly Pinoy Samurai) is a Philippine comedy game show hosted by Joey de Leon as Prinsipe Sutsut (lit. Prince Sutsut), Ruffa Mi (Kimonay), Wilma Doesnt (Itimpura) and Mr. Fu (Gaysha), broadcast by TV5 and aired on Sundays before Paparazzi Showbiz Exposed.

It features celebrities engaged in different games, obstacles and challenges administered by Prinsipe Sutsut.

The show was formerly called Pinoy Samurai, and featured ordinary Filipinos engaged in different obstacles to become the Pinoy Samurai, who won a reward for up to 150,000 pesos cash.

Main hosts
 Joey de Leon as Prinsipe Sutsut
 Ruffa Mi as Kimonay
 Wilma Doesnt as Itimpura
 Mr. Fu as Gaysha

Games and Game Masters

Sumo Kokana
 Tiny - The giant sumo wrestler
 Godzira - The not-so-sturdy monster
 Kulang the Barbarian - The skinny Barbarian
 Princess Hentay

Who Wants to be a Pritong Psychic
 Joey de Leon as Prinsipe Sutsut

Angry Balls
 Wilma Doesnt as Itimpura
 Mr. Fu as Gaysha

Tsunami Chair
 Ruffa Mi as Kimonay
 Joey de Leon as Prinsipe Sutsut

Pin The Tail on the Pig
 Tita Kris
 K.O.

Other games
Putok to Putok
Roulette Trap
Hiro Bato
Ang Tenga Tenga Mo
Japajump
Apakyaw

See also
 List of programs broadcast by TV5

External links
  Official TV5
 

Philippine game shows
TV5 (Philippine TV network) original programming
2011 Philippine television series debuts
2012 Philippine television series endings
Filipino-language television shows